Flemish is a Dutch dialect cluster spoken in the Flemish Region.

Flemish may also refer to:

People and language
Flemish people or Flemings, inhabitants of Flanders, the western part of Belgium
Flemish is often used to describe the Belgian Dutch spoken in Flanders: 
West Flemish dialects
East Flemish dialects

Places
Flemish Community, a constitutional, institutionalized community comprising the majority of Belgians
Flemish Region, a constitutional region, the northern half of Belgium without the Brussels enclave 
Flemish Brabant, a province in the Flemish Region

Arts, entertainment, and media
Flemish Eye, a Canadian record label named after a Flemish eye
Flemish literature, the literature of Flanders
Flemish painting, a historic school of painting centered in Flanders

Government and politics
Flemish Government, the executive branch of the Flemish Community and Flemish Region
Flemish Liberals and Democrats, political party
Flemish movement, a political movement for Flemish autonomy
Flemish Parliament, the legislative assembly of the Flemish Community and Flemish Region

Knots
Flemish bend, a type of figure-of-eight knot
Flemish eye, a circular type of knot
Flemish knot, a type of figure-of-eight knot

Other uses
Flemish bond, a type of brickwork bond
Flemish Giant rabbit, a type of rabbit

Language and nationality disambiguation pages